The Prosperity Cemetery is located on McNeary Street (South Carolina Route 391) on the south side of Prosperity, South Carolina. The cemetery is distinctive for the fine quality of its funerary art in what is essentially a rural backcountry setting, and for the unusual concentration of gravestones that were signed by local merchants and stonecutters. The cemetery was established as the burying ground for a Presbyterian congregation, but is now managed by a local cemetery company and now serves as the town's main cemetery.

The cemetery was listed on the National Register of Historic Places in 2013.

See also
 National Register of Historic Places listings in Newberry County, South Carolina

References

External links
 

National Register of Historic Places in Newberry County, South Carolina
Cemeteries on the National Register of Historic Places in South Carolina